Damayanti is a Bengali television-series released on Bengali OTT platform Hoichoi on 22 October 2020. On season 4 announcement Hoichoi announced their upcoming twenty-five web series, Damayanti based on the story of Manoj Sen is one of them. Directed by Aritra Sen and Rohan Ghosh the series features Tuhina Das, Indrasish Roy, Soumya Banerjee, Chandrayee Ghosh, Amrita Chattopadhyay in the lead roles. Second season of this series titled Nokol Heere released on 2021.

Plot
In this series a professor of history; a computer hacker – Damayanti married to a lovable husband Samaresh. Damayanti's passion lies in cracking psychological mysteries. They move to Santiniketan for an outing and stay in the Guest house of Mr.Roy. Damayanti observes that something unusual is happening in the Roy family. She starts the investigation on her own. Samaresh's friend Shiben, a police officer helps Damayanti.

Cast 
 Tuhina Das as Damayanti Dutta Gupta
 Amrita Chattopadhyay as Sarmishtha
 Indrasish Roy as Samaresh Dutta Gupta
 Soumya Banerjee as Siben Sen
 Chandrayee Ghosh as  Munia Roy (in Season 1)
 Amrita Chattopadhyay as Sarmishtha Roy (in Season 1)
 Gautam Purkayastha (in Season 1)
 Arpan Ghoshal (in Season 1)
 Rajnandini Paul (in Nokol Heere)
 Anindita Raychaudhary (in Nokol Heere)
 Sujoy Prasad Chatterjee as Ramanuj (in Nokol Heere)
 Atmadeep Ghosh (in Nokol Heere)
 Sudip Sarkar (in Nokol Heere)
 Biswajit Chakraborty as Mr. Mitra (in Nokol Heere)
 Yash Barma as Sudipto

Overview

Season 1 (2020)
On October 6, 2020, Hoichoi released the official teaser of the series. On 11 October Hoichoi also released the title track of the series. The season started streaming from 22 October 2020. On 29th October 2020 hoichoi released all the remaining episodes on their platform.

Nokol Heere (2021)
On 12 March 2021, Hoichoi released the second season of Damayanti, titled Nokol Heere.

Episodes

Season 1

Nokol Heere

References

External links

2020 web series debuts
Indian crime television series
Hoichoi original programming